Zhang Weihong (born January 31, 1963, in Yangquan, Shanxi) is a former female Chinese handball player. She competed in the 1984 Summer Olympics and in the 1988 Summer Olympics.

In 1984, she was a member of the Chinese handball team which won the bronze medal.  She played all five matches and scored three goals.

Four years later she was part of the Chinese team which finished sixth. She played all five matches and scored ten goals.

References

External links
profile 

1963 births
Living people
Chinese female handball players
Handball players at the 1984 Summer Olympics
Handball players at the 1988 Summer Olympics
Olympic handball players of China
Olympic bronze medalists for China
People from Yangquan
Olympic medalists in handball
Sportspeople from Shanxi
Medalists at the 1984 Summer Olympics